Sailing competitions at the 2011 Pan American Games in Guadalajara were held from October 17 to October 23 at the Vallarta Yacht Club in Puerto Vallarta.

Medal summary

Medal table

Men's events

Women's events

Open events

Schedule
All times are Central Daylight Time (UTC-5).

Qualification

References

 
Events at the 2011 Pan American Games
P
Puerto Vallarta
2011